John Ronald Carter (born 9 August 1963) is a former English cricketer.  Carter was a right-handed batsman.  He was born in Brundall, Norfolk.

Carter made his debut for Norfolk in the 1984 Minor Counties Championship against Northumberland.  Carter played Minor counties cricket for Norfolk from 1984 to 1987, which included 17 Minor Counties Championship matches and 7 MCCA Knockout Trophy matches.  He made his only List A appearance in 1985 against Leicestershire in the NatWest Trophy.  In this match, he was dismissed for 8 runs by Paddy Clift.

References

External links
John Carter at ESPNcricinfo
John Carter at CricketArchive

1963 births
Living people
People from Brundall
English cricketers
Norfolk cricketers
Sportspeople from Norfolk